Ron Pompei is an American designer born in Washington, D.C.. Trained as an artist, sculptor and designer, he received a Bachelor of Architecture from the Cooper Union in New York, a B.A. in Fine Arts from the Philadelphia College of Art, and studied Industrial Design at Pratt Institute.

Career 
He began his creative journey as an artist, creating light art installations and sculptures that Philadelphia magazine cited as “changing the face of Philadelphia". He taught design at Drexel University in Philadelphia in the mid-1970s. In 1990 Pompei co-founded Pompei A.D., a creative services firm based in New York City where he serves as principal and creative director. Well known for its innovative approach towards retail design, the firm has collaborated with a wide spectrum of clients including Anthropologie, California Academy of Sciences, Coca-Cola, Fortune, Harley-Davidson, Herman Miller, Kiehl's Since 1851, Kmart, Levi's, MTV, Old Navy, Rubin Museum of Art, Sony, Té Casan, The Discovery Channel, UCLA Neuropsychiatric Institute, and Urban Outfitters.

Work 
Pompei's work is based on his design philosophy, C3: Commerce, Culture and Community. This integration is at the heart of the idea of the “transformative environment,” a running theme throughout Pompei's work.
His approach earned him a spot in Mavericks at Work, a book written by Fast Company co-founder William C. Taylor and longtime editor Polly LaBarre, about the "most original minds in business". Pompei's philosophy of “transformational experiences” as applied to his work with Anthropologie and Urban Outfitters is discussed the book The Elements of Persuasion, written by Robert Dickman and Richard Maxwell as an example of effective storytelling. Pompei’s understanding of the customer's role in a retail environment, specifically Anthropologie, is discussed in David Wolfe's book Ageless Marketing. In his 2004 article “Ron Pompei can’t be obvious.” Jorge Forbes explains why Pompei’s idea of the customer is so successful. “Pompei’s work is getting to people precisely because he doesn’t treat them like customers. He gave up understanding them through any collective references that would conceive everyone like anyone. Pompei has permitted each one to be each one, and that’s not something people “have”, not even in their brains. That’s something they “are”.”

Pompei has participated as a featured speaker at industry, branding and educational venues, including Kjaer Global, Style-Vision, Wharton School of Business, Gel conference, Index 2005, 92nd St Y Makor Talk, BBC Digital Futures, Urban Land Institute, EtherTalk, The International Council of Shopping Centers Annual Conference, VM SD’s International Retail Design Conference, Quo Vadis’ The Real Estate Development Congress, International Hotel Investment Forum, Retail Marketing Society, American Law Firm Association (ALFA) Conference, EXP3, the Multicultural Equity Conference, Institute of Store Planners Seminar at Global Shop and Liz Claiborne Designer Roundtable.

Awards 
Pompei has been the recipient of numerous awards, including an American Institute of Graphic Arts Annual Design Award and a "Store of the Year" award from Visual Merchandising + Store Design magazine in 1998 & 1999. The American Institute of Graphic Arts awarded Pompei a certificate of excellence in design for the Exposure Brochure, selected in the “AIGA Communication Graphics 21” competition of 2000. In 2003 and 2004, Pompei was awarded “The Best Specialty Store Merit Award,” and in 2004, was included in Fast Company’s Fast 50, in the Innovators category.  In 2006 and 2007, Display and Design Ideas magazine named Pompei as one of the most influential people in the U.S. design industry.

References

Living people
Year of birth missing (living people)
Cooper Union alumni
Artists from Washington, D.C.
University of the Arts (Philadelphia) alumni
American designers
Pratt Institute alumni